Christina McAnea (born 1958) is a Scottish  trade union leader.  She was elected as general secretary of Unison in succession to Dave Prentis, and took up the post on 22 January 2021.

Early life and education
Christina McAnea was born in 1958 in Glasgow and grew up in the Drumchapel area, where she attended St.Pius School (now the location of Drumchapel High School).  She worked in the Civil Service, National Health Service and retail, before going to the University of Strathclyde to study English and history.

Career

Early career
After university, she worked at Glasgow City Council as a housing officer before starting to work for the GMB, where she advised workers taking cases before their employers.

Unison
McAnea has worked at Unison since its founding in 1993. She previously worked at the National and Local Government Officers' Association (NALGO), initially as women's officer, before its amalgamation into Unison. She became one of five assistant general secretaries of Unison in May 2018.

General Secretary of Unison
McAnea was elected to succeed Dave Prentis as General Secretary of Unison on 11 January 2021, after winning 47.7% of the members' vote. Prentis had been General Secretary for 20 years. She took up office on 22 January 2021.

Personal life
McAnea lives in south London and is married. She has two adult children. McAnea is a member of the Labour Party. In the early 1980s, she was a member of the Communist Party of Great Britain.

References

1958 births
Living people
General Secretaries of Unison (trade union)
British trade unionists
Women trade unionists
Members of the General Council of the Trades Union Congress
Alumni of the University of Strathclyde
Trade unionists from Glasgow